Revalina Trinovianti Sayuthi Temat, Revalina Trinovianti Gunawan or better known as Revalina S. Temat (born in Jakarta, Indonesia on November 26, 1985) is an Indonesian actress and model of mixed Malay and Minangkabau descent.

Career

Early career
She started her career as a contestant on GADIS Sampul in 1999, then started to work as a model and as an actress in soap operas and films. Se has appeared in the soap operas Percikan, Sangkuriang, Cintaku di Kampus Biru 2, and Bawang Merah Bawang Putih. She appeared in the films Pocong 2 (2006), and Perempuan Berkalung Sorban (2009), for which she was nominated for Citra Award for Best Leading Actress at the 2009 Indonesian Film Festival. She also starred in a drama collaboration between Indonesia and Korea entitled Saranghae I Love You, paired with Korean singer Tim Hwang.

Filmography

Film

TV Series
 Kupu-Kupu Ungu (1998)
 Suami, Istri & Dia (2000)
 Jinny oh Jinny (2001)
 Percikan (2001)
 Sangkuriang (2003)
 Cintaku di Kampus Biru 2 (2003–2004)
 JP (2004)
 Asyiknya Pacaran
 Bawang Merah Bawang Putih (2004)
 Dara Manisku
 Dicintai
 Kumpul Bocah
 Rahasia Perkawinan
 Hikmah 2
 Kembang Surga
 Cinta dengan Luka (2002) FTV
 Gerangan Cinta (2003) FTV
 Gara Gara Sofie Punya Mau
 " Saranghae, I Love You " (2012)
 Jangan Bercerai Bunda (2022)

Video Clips

TV Commercial

Awards and nominations

External links

 Profile and news at KapanLagi.com
 Photos of Revalina S. Temat

References

1985 births
Indonesian female models
Indonesian film actresses
Indonesian television actresses
Living people
People from Jakarta
Minangkabau people
Indonesian people of Malay descent
Indonesian Muslims